The 2023 Nigerian Senate elections in Cross River State will be held on 25 February 2023, to elect the 3 federal Senators from Cross River State, one from each of the state's three senatorial districts. The elections will coincide with the 2023 presidential election, as well as other elections to the Senate and elections to the House of Representatives; with state elections being held two weeks later. Primaries were held between 4 April and 9 June 2022.

Background
In the previous Senate elections, two of three incumbent senators were returned with John Owan Enoh (APC-Central) retiring to unsuccessfully run for governor while Rose Okoji Oko (PDP-North) and Gershom Bassey (PDP-South) were re-elected. In the Central district, Sandy Ojang Onor regained the seat for the PDP with 57% of the vote; the PDP held the other two seats as Oko was re-elected with 73% of the vote in the North while Bassey was returned with 55% in the South district. These results were a part of a continuation of the PDP's control of the state as Governor Benedict Ayade was re-elected with over 73% of the vote in the gubernatorial election and the party won every seat in the House of Assembly. However, the PDP did lose one House of Representatives seat to the APC and although the state was easily won by PDP presidential nominee Atiku Abubakar, it still swung towards Buhari compared to 2015 and had lower turnout.

During the term, much of the news about Cross River senators focused on the Northern seat as Oko died in March 2020 with the legal and political battles over the ensuing by-election took place over a year. After disputed PDP primaries, Stephen Odey initially won the seat and was sworn in but courts later ruled in MHR Agom Jarigbe's favour and he took office in September 2021.

Overview

Summary

Cross River Central 

The Cross River Central Senatorial District covers the local government areas of Abi, Boki, Etung, Ikom, Obubra, and Yakurr. The incumbent Sandy Ojang Onor (PDP) was elected with 56.6% of the vote in 2019. In March 2022, Onor announced that he would run for governor of Cross River State instead of seeking re-election.

Primary elections

All Progressives Congress 

On the primary date, an indirect primary in Ikom resulted in the victory of Eteng Williams—the Speaker of the Cross River State House of Assembly and MHA for Yakurr II. Williams beat first runner-up Akin Ricketts, the chairman of the Board of the Nigerian Ports Authority, by a 14% margin. Like other APC senatorial primary winners, Williams was noted for being an ally of Governor Benedict Ayade; the primary itself was rejected by another candidate, Okoi Obono-Obla. Months later in early December, a Federal High Court ruling annulled the primaries and ordered a rerun exercise. The rerun primary was conducted on 17 December, with it also resulting in the nomination of Williams over his opponents. Nevertheless, aspirant Mary Ekpere returned to court in an attempt to disqualify Williams and first runner-up John Inyang then declared herself as victor.

People's Democratic Party 

On the primary date, candidates contested a direct primary that ended with Bassey Ewa winning the nomination after results showed him defeating former commissioner Goddy Eta by a narrow margin of eight votes.

General election

Results

Cross River North 

The Cross River North Senatorial District covers the local government areas of Bekwarra, Biase, Obanliku, Obudu, Ogoja, and Yala. In 2019, Rose Okoji Oko (PDP) was re-elected to the seat with 73.3% of the vote. Oko died in March 2020, leading to a by-election in December 2020. Although the PDP won the by-election, a dispute over the legitimate PDP primary victor between Agom Jarigbe and Stephen Odey delayed the inauguration; Odey won both initial court decisions and took office late in December 2020. However, Jarigbe later won several court challenges which declared him the legitimate PDP nominee and thus Senator; he took office in September 2021. Jarigbe is seeking re-election.

Primary elections

All Progressives Congress 

On the primary date, the indirect primary at the Liyel Imoke Pavilion in Ogoja ended with Martins Orim—former Chief of Staff to the Cross River State Government—emerging as the nominee unanimously. Like other APC senatorial primary winners, Orim was noted for being an ally of Governor Benedict Ayade, having been on the "oga's list" of Ayade's anointed candidates. The other candidate, Cecilia Adams, boycotted the Pavilion primary and held a parallel primary in which she won. However, the APC recognized the Pavilion primary and accepted Orim as the legitimate nominee until he withdrew from the nomination in July. The withdrawal led to a new primary in Ogoja, won by Ayade himself unopposed after the failure of his presidential campaign. In his acceptance speech, Ayade thanked delegates and vowed to return to the Senate. Although Adams challenged the primary in court, her case was dismissed in February 2023.

People's Democratic Party 

On the primary date, an indirect primary ended with Jarigbe's renomination as he was unopposed.

Campaign 
Opponents of Ayade noted the lack of development in the district throughout his first term as senator and two terms as governor as rationale to vote against him.

General election

Results

Cross River South 

The Cross River South Senatorial District covers the local government areas of Akamkpa, Akpabuyo, Bakassi, Calabar Municipal, Calabar South, and Odukpani. The incumbent Gershom Bassey (PDP) was re-elected with 54.5% of the vote in 2019. In March 2022, Onor announced that he would run for governor of Cross River State instead of seeking re-election; he was defeated in the PDP gubernatorial primary.

Primary elections

All Progressives Congress 

Two candidates contested in the primary that ended with Asuquo Ekpenyong—former state Commissioner for Finance—emerging as the nominee unanimously. Ekpenyong thanked his supporters in his acceptance speech. Like other APC senatorial primary winners, Ekpenyong was noted for being an ally of Governor Benedict Ayade, having been on the "oga's list" of Ayade's anointed candidates.

People's Democratic Party 

On the primary date, two candidates contested a direct primary that ended with Ekpo Okon—former state PDP chairman—winning the nomination after results showed him defeating Joseph Edet by a 60% margin. After the primary, Edet conceded and accepted the results while Okon commended PDP internal democracy during the process.

Campaign 
In a January 2023 overview of legislative races in the South South, reporters from Vanguard noted key issues for the campaigns of Okon—he was caught in between the blocs of the state PDP with his longtime allies (former governors Liyel Imoke and Donald Duke) on one side while the PDP gubernatorial nominee Sandy Ojang Onor was on the other side—and disputed LP nominee Daniel Effiong Asuquo—some people blamed his refusal to withdraw from the PDP gubernatorial primary as the cause of Bassey's defeat.

General election

Results

See also 
 2023 Nigerian Senate election
 2023 Nigerian elections

References 

Cross River State senatorial elections
2023 Cross River State elections
Cross River State Senate elections